Tōru Azuma (born September 16, 1966 in Osaka Prefecture, Japan) is a Japanese politician who has served as a member of the House of Councillors of Japan since 2013. He represents the Osaka at-large district and is a member of the Japan Innovation Party.

References 

Living people
1966 births
Politicians from Osaka Prefecture
21st-century Japanese politicians
Members of the House of Councillors (Japan)
Japan Innovation Party politicians